Annibale Gaetani di Ceccano (c. 1282 – 1350) was an Italian Cardinal. His palace, the Livrée Ceccano at Avignon, begun in about 1335/1340, still survives; it is now a public library.

He was Archbishop of Naples from 1326 to 1328 and undertook diplomatic missions, for example setting up the 1343 truce between England and France. He was Bishop of Frascati from 1332 to 1350. He was archpriest of Saint Peter's Basilica (1342-1350), as well as Archdeacon of Cornwall from  1342 to 1344, and Archdeacon of Nottingham from 1331 to 1348.

He is celebrated for the luxury of a feast he gave in 1343 for Pope Clement VI, an eye-witness account of which has survived.

Notes

References
Marc Dykmans, "Le cardinal Annibal de Ceccano (vers 1282-1350). Étude biographique et testament du 17 juin 1348", in Bulletin de l'institut historique belge de Rome, 43, 1973, pp. 145–344,

1282 births
1350 deaths
14th-century Italian Roman Catholic archbishops
Archdeacons of Buckingham
Archdeacons of Cornwall
Archdeacons of Nottingham
Archbishops of Naples
Cardinal-bishops of Frascati
14th-century Italian cardinals
People from the Province of Frosinone